The Global Studies Consortium (GSC) is an international academic association of over 20 institutions of higher learning. It seeks to "promote and facilitate graduate teaching programs in global studies and to foster cooperation among them." That cooperation includes exchange of materials and development of methods to survey outcomes, annual meetings, and a student exchange program. GSC deals only with graduate level programs, and there is no comparable association for undergraduate degree programs in global studies.

The GSC was founded at a meeting of representatives of university global studies programs held in February 2007 at the Orfalea Center for Global and International Studies of the University of California at Santa Barbara. It has been influential in defining the new field of global studies.

GSC is linked to global-e: A Global Studies Journal.

Members
The member programs of the GSC are listed by continent below:

Africa
 The American University in Cairo (Egypt), School of Global Affairs and Public Policy

Asia
 Hanyang University (South Korea), Research Institute of Comparative History and Culture; Graduate Program in Transnational Humanities
 Hitotsubashi University (Japan),  Institute for the Study of Global Issues
 Shanghai University (China), Center for Global Studies
 Shantou University (China), Center for Global Studies
 Sophia University (Japan), Graduate Program in Global Studies

Australia
 RMIT University (Australia), School of Global Studies, Social Science and Planning
 Australian National University (Australia), Master of Globalisation

Europe
 Aarhus University (Denmark), MA in International Studies
 Berlin Graduate School for Transnational Studies (Germany) (information)
 Free University of Berlin 
 Hertie School of Governance
 Social Science Research Center Berlin
 European Master (which is also part of the Erasmus Mundus program)
 University of Leipzig (Germany), Global and European Studies Institute (co-ordinating institution)
 London School of Economics and Political Science (United Kingdom), Economic History Department
 Roskilde University (Denmark), Department of Society & Globalization
 University of Vienna (Austria), Department of History
 University of Wroclaw (Poland), Institute of International Studies
 Ghent University (Belgium), Ghent Centre for Global Studies
 Lomonosov Moscow State University (Russia), Faculty of Global Processes
 University of Graz (Austria), Master's program in Global Studies

North America
 Arizona State University (US), School of Global Studies
 Rutgers University-Newark (US), Division of Global Affairs
 The New School (US), International Affairs and Global Perspectives
 University of California at Santa Barbara (US), Global & International Studies Program
 University of Illinois at Urbana-Champaign (US), Center for Global Studies
 University of Minnesota (US), Institute for Global Studies
 University of North Carolina at Chapel Hill (US), Curriculum in International and Area Studies
 University of Pittsburgh (US), World History Center / Global Studies Center
 Wilfrid Laurier University (Canada), Global Studies

Student exchange program

In 2014, GSC started an exchange program called Student Mobility Scheme. As of 2016, four of the member institutions participate: American University in Cairo; Lomonosov Moscow State University; Shanghai University; and Sophia University.

Meetings
The GSC has held meetings every year following the 2007 workshop at UCSB where it was founded:
 Tokyo, hosted by Sophia University, 17–18 May 2008. (At this meeting participants identified 5 main characteristics of global studies.)
 Leipzig, hosted by University of Leipzig, 17–18 October 2009
 Santa Barbara, hosted by University of California - Santa Barbara, 24–25 April 2010
 Shanghai, Hosted by Shanghai University, 17–18 June 2011 (This meeting was preceded by the China Forum on Global Studies.)
 Melbourne, hosted by RMIT University, Melbourne, 14–17 June 2012
 Moscow, hosted by Moscow State University, 20–23 June 2013
 Roskilde, hosted by Roskilde University, 18–22 June 2014
 Cairo, hosted by the School of Global Affairs at the American University in Cairo, 4–8 June 2015
 Pittsburgh, hosted by the Global Studies Center and World History Center of the University of Pittsburgh, June 2016

References

External links
 Global Studies Consortium website

International relations education
International college and university associations and consortia
Global studies research